Lebedodes leifaarviki is a moth in the family Cossidae. It is found in Tanzania, where it has been recorded from the central subregion of the Eastern Arc Mountains.

Etymology
The species is named for Leif Aarvik.

References

Natural History Museum Lepidoptera generic names catalog

Endemic fauna of Tanzania
Metarbelinae
Moths described in 2009